Arboa is a genus of flowering plants belonging to the family Passifloraceae.

Its native range is Madagascar.

Species:

Arboa antsingyae 
Arboa berneriana 
Arboa integrifolia 
Arboa madagascariensis

References

Passifloraceae
Malpighiales genera